Conant is a pictish surname, and means mighty. It may refer to:

 Adam Conant, fictional character
 Charles "Carlos" Conant Maldonado (1842–1907), Mexican businessman, colonel, and politician
 Charles Conant (1861–1915), American economist
 David Stoughton Conant (1949–2018), American botanist
 Deborah Henson-Conant (born 1953), American harpist
 Douglas Conant, American businessman
 Frances Augusta Hemingway Conant (1842-1903), American journalist, editor, businesswoman
 Frederic Conant (1892–1974), American yacht racer
 Gordon Conant (1885–1953), Canadian politician
 James Bryant Conant (1893–1978), American chemist and President of Harvard University
 James F. Conant (born 1958), American philosopher
 Jennet Conant, American journalist and author 
 John Conant (1608–1694), English clergyman and university vice-chancellor
 Kenneth John Conant (1894-1984), American architectural historian 
 Levi Conant (1857–1916), American mathematician 
 Marcus Conant (born 1936), American dermatologist and HIV/AIDS expert
 Norman Francis Conant (1908–1984), American medical mycologist 
 Ralph W. Conant (born 1926), American urban planner
 Roger Conant (colonist) (c.1592–1679), early Massachusetts settler
 Sir Roger Conant, 1st Baronet (1899–1973), British politician
 Roger Conant (herpetologist) (1909–2003), American herpetologist
 Scott Conant (born 1971), American chef 
 Susan Conant, American mystery writer
 Thomas Jefferson Conant (1802–1891), American Bible scholar
 James B. Conant High School, a public school in Hoffman Estates, Illinois.

See also
 Conant family
 conan (disambiguation)